The 1945–46 La Liga was the 15th season since its establishment. Sevilla achieved their first title ever, secured with a 1–1 draw on the final matchday away to Barcelona, their direct rivals for the championship who would have taken the trophy with a win.

Team locations

Alcoyano made their debut in La Liga.

League table

Results

Relegation play-offs
The match and the replay match were played at Estadio Olímpico de Montjuïc.

|}

Top scorers

References

External links
 Official LFP Site

1945 1946
1945–46 in Spanish football leagues
Spain